Mahmoud A. ElSohly is an Egyptian-born American pharmacologist known for his research into cannabis. He is a professor of pharmaceutics and research professor at the Research Institute of Pharmaceutical Sciences at the University of Mississippi. He is also the director of the University of Mississippi's Marijuana Research Project, the only legal source of marijuana that can be used for medical research in the United States. He is also the president and laboratory director of ElSohly Laboratories, Incorporated.

Education and career

ElSohly received his B.S. and M.S. from Cairo University, after which he received his Ph.D. from the University of Pittsburgh. He began working at the University of Mississippi in 1976. In 1980, he became the director of their Marijuana Project.

In addition to his work on cannabis, ElSohly's research on urushiol led to the development of PDC-APB, a candidate for a vaccine against skin irritation from poison ivy.

Books

References

External links
Mississippi Faculty page
ElSohly Laboratories, Inc.
 
Interview with Claudia Dreifus

Living people
American pharmacologists
Cairo University alumni
University of Pittsburgh alumni
University of Mississippi faculty
Egyptian emigrants to the United States
Cannabis researchers
Year of birth missing (living people)